Bodo (c. 814
– 876) was a Frankish deacon at the court of Emperor Louis the Pious, who caused a notorious case of apostasy in the Europe of his day.

Life
In early 838, Bodo declared that he was embarking to make a pilgrimage to Rome, but instead went to Muslim Spain, where he converted to Judaism. His conversion was regarded as a rejection of the Carolingian culture, as well as of the Christian faith. He took the Jewish name of Eleazar, had himself circumcised and married a Jewish woman. In 839, Bodo moved to Saragossa, where he incited the government of the Caliphate of Cordoba and the people to persecute the Spanish Christians.  Léon Poliakov claims that this conversion is evidence of the high regard in which Jews were held in Carolingian France.

Correspondence with Álvaro 
In 840 Bodo began a correspondence with a Christian intellectual, Pablo Álvaro of Cordova, also in Muslim Spain. Alvaro was born a Jew, but had converted to Christianity. Because Bodo and Alvaro were both converts, they began a dialogue to try to convince each other to go back to their old faith. Some of their letters have been preserved.

The source of the following letter is disputed, but it is attributed to Bodo:

As for your assertion that Christ is God, joined with the Holy Spirit, and you worship him because he had no human father, then along with him you ought to worship Adam the father of the human race, who had neither father nor mother, whose flesh, blood, bones and skin were created from clay. Breath was put in him by the Holy Spirit, and he became an intelligent being. Then too, Eve was created from Adam's rib without a father or mother, and breath came into her and she became intelligent. So worship them too!

See also 
 Pablo Álvaro
 La Convivencia
 Golden age of Jewish culture in Spain

References 

External link

Translation of the correspondence between Álvaro and Bodo by Aymenn Jawad Al-Tamimi 

810s births
876 deaths
People from the Carolingian Empire
Roman Catholic deacons
Converts to Judaism from Roman Catholicism
9th-century Jews from al-Andalus
Medieval Jewish writers
Sephardi Jews